Parmotrema austrosinense is a widely distributed species of lichen in the family Parmeliaceae. It was first officially described as a species of Parmelia by Austrian botanist Alexander Zahlbruckner in 1930. Mason Hale transferred it to Parmotrema in 1974.

See also
List of Parmotrema species

References

austrosinense
Lichen species
Lichens described in 1930
Lichens of Africa
Lichens of Asia
Lichens of Central America
Lichens of Europe
Lichens of North America
Lichens of Oceania
Lichens of South America
Taxa named by Alexander Zahlbruckner